Tobias Åslund is a Swedish ski-orienteering competitor. He won a bronze medal in the sprint distance at the 2005 World Ski Orienteering Championships in Levi, a bronze medal with the Swedish relay team, and placed fifth in the long distance.

References

Swedish orienteers
Male orienteers
Ski-orienteers
Year of birth missing (living people)
Living people
21st-century Swedish people